Leon Arthur Pettit (June 23, 1902 – November 21, 1974) was a pitcher in Major League Baseball. He played for the Washington Senators and Philadelphia Phillies.

References

External links

1902 births
1974 deaths
Major League Baseball pitchers
Washington Senators (1901–1960) players
Philadelphia Phillies players
Baseball players from Pennsylvania
Waco Cubs players
Dallas Steers players
Beaumont Exporters players
Memphis Chickasaws players
Springfield Senators players
Quincy Indians players
Chattanooga Lookouts players
Albany Senators players
Minneapolis Millers (baseball) players
Baltimore Orioles (IL) players
Portsmouth Cubs players
New Orleans Pelicans (baseball) players
Abbeville A's players
Spartanburg Spartans players